Niels Guldbjerg (born 10 February 1958) is a Danish retired professional footballer who played in the North American Soccer League and the Major Indoor Soccer League for the Detroit Express, Philadelphia Fever, New Jersey Rockets and Buffalo Stallions.

In his native country Guldbjerg played for Aalborg (1976–1977), Frederikshavn (1978) and Herfølge BK (1979) before moving to the US. In the summer of 1982, he played in the National Soccer League originally with Detroit Besa, and later with Toronto Italia. In 1983, he played in the Canadian Professional Soccer League with Hamilton Steelers.

He also served as Head Coach of the NCAA Division 1 Niagara University Purple Eagles during the 1984 season posting a 4–8 record.

References

External links
NASL/MISL career stats

1958 births
Living people
Buffalo Stallions players
Danish men's footballers
Danish expatriate men's footballers
AaB Fodbold players
Herfølge Boldklub players
Detroit Express players
Major Indoor Soccer League (1978–1992) players
New Jersey Rockets (MISL) players
North American Soccer League (1968–1984) players
Philadelphia Fever (MISL) players
Toronto Italia players
Hamilton Steelers (1981–1992) players
Niagara Purple Eagles men's soccer coaches
Association football midfielders
Danish football managers
Danish expatriate sportspeople in the United States
Expatriate soccer players in the United States
Danish expatriate football managers
Expatriate soccer managers in the United States
Canadian National Soccer League players
Canadian Professional Soccer League (original) players
Danish expatriate sportspeople in Canada
Expatriate soccer players in Canada
Frederikshavn fI players